A referendum on electoral redistributions in South Australia was held on 9 February 1991.  The proposal put to voters would require the South Australian Electoral Districts Boundaries Commission to redistribute the electoral boundaries following every election, and to consider a broader range of criteria when reviewing boundaries: specifically, "to draw the boundaries in such a way that the party with the majority of (the two-party) vote would also win the majority of seats and so be able to form government". The proposals were accepted by a wide margin.

Results

References

Referendums in South Australia
1991 referendums
1991 in Australia
February 1991 events in Australia
1990s in South Australia